Life is Cueshe's fourth and current album released on September 1, 2010 by Musiko Records & Sony Music Philippines Inc.

Track listing

References

2010 albums
Cueshé albums